The Rising Place is a 2002 American drama film written and directed by Tom Rice and starring Laurel Holloman, Elise Neal and Mark Webber.  It is based on the novel of the same name by David Armstrong.

Cast
Laurel Holloman as Emily Hodge
Elise Neal as Wilma Watson
Mark Webber as Will Bacon
Liam Aiken as Emmett Wilder
Billy Campbell as Streete Wilder
Gary Cole as Avery Hodge
Alice Drummond as Aunt Millie
Frances Fisher as Virginia Wilder
Mason Gamble as Franklin Pou (age 12)
Beth Grant as Melvina Pou
Tess Harper as Rebecca Hodge
S. Epatha Merkerson as Lessie Watson
Scott Openshaw as Eddie Scruggs
Frances Sternhagen as Ruth Wilder
Jennifer Holliday as Sadie

Reception
The film has a 13% rating on Rotten Tomatoes.  Ed Gonzalez of Slant Magazine awarded the film two stars out of four.

References

External links
 
 

American drama films
Films based on American novels
2002 drama films
2002 films
2000s English-language films
2000s American films